Risto Kalervo Näätänen (born 14 June 1939 in Helsinki, Finland) is a psychological scientist, pioneer in the field of cognitive neuroscience, and known worldwide as one of the discoverers of the electrophysiological mismatch negativity. He has been a much-cited social scientist and one of the few individuals appointed permanent Academy Professor of the Academy of Finland. He retired in 2007 , retaining a title of Academy Professor emeritus of the Academy of Finland. Since 2007, he has been a professor at the University of Tartu.

Biography

Education 
He started to study psychology in the University of Helsinki in 1958, training in cognitive electrophysiology at the laboratory of Donald B. Lindsley at the University of California, Los Angeles (1965-1966). Under Lindsley's supervision, he defended his doctoral dissertation about brain mechanisms of selective attention  at the University of Helsinki in 1967. As early as that he started to influence the scientific world: in his thesis he refuted a then well-known experimental design and no works have ever been published using that design again.

Career 
In 1975, at an age of 36, having published 13 academic articles, he was appointed as a Professor of General Psychology at the University of Helsinki. In practice, he was at that department until 1999, but officially on leave from 1983, being salaried as an Academy Professor of The Academy of Finland. He is founder of the Cognitive Brain Research Unit (CBRU) at the University of Helsinki - a unit of which he was director from 1991–2006.

Näätänen retired in 2007, a retirement symposium was held in his honor in 2008. Since 2008, he has been a Professor of Cognitive Neuroscience at the University of Tartu, Estonia, Visiting Professor at the Centre of Functionally Integrative Neurosciences (CFIN) of the University of Århus, Denmark, retaining a tertiary affiliation at the University of Helsinki as of May 2014, having held the title of an Academy Professor emeritus of the Academy of Finland since retirement.

He has sat on editorial boards and reviewed for specialist journals (e.g., Brain Research, International Journal of Psychophysiology, Journal of Cognitive Neuroscience, NeuroReport). He has published articles from collaborations with thousands of researchers. As of June 2014, according to Google Scholar no collaborators are listed as co-authors and citations totalled 62182 (17578 since 2013) resulting in an h-index of 128 (64 since 2009), being amongst the 0.5% most-cited scientists still alive, the most-cited scientist in Finnish and Estonian history. Noteworthy is that Teuvo Kohonen also vies for the title of most-cited Finnish scientist.

Legacy 
His life work revolved around the mismatch negativity (MMN) first revealed in collaboration with Anthony W.K. Gaillard, and Sirkka Mäntysalo in reinterpretion of the prior findings of an early selective attention effect - discovered by Steven Hillyard - as a consequence of experiments that were carried out in the Institute for Perception TNO, Soesterberg, Netherlands, in the summer of 1975, by Sirkka Mäntysalo.  MMN has been established as a scalp-negative component of the event-related potential or ERPs, as derived from recordings made electroencephalographically via electrodes attached to the scalp. MMN was shown to be elicited by deviant stimuli interspersed amongst a series of standards.

MMN has influenced theories of language perception, together with studies of cognitive development and musical intelligence. Risto Näätänen has been most interested in the clinical scope: abnormalities of MMN have been associated with alcoholism, psychosis in schizophrenia, Alzheimer's disease, Parkinson's disease, and dyslexia. Facets of MMN have been associated with the prediction of waking in comatose individuals - as has been hailed as a breakthrough - yet MMN has remained a research tool and has not met criteria to determine clinical decisions about the continuation of life support.

Risto Näätänen's major societal impact was to influence Finnish traffic politics, his studies of traffic behavior - conducted during the presidency of Kekkonen - leading to the establishment of speed limits on Finnish roads. Reaching the age of 74 in 2013, he expressed hopes that MMN would be implemented in education.

Books 
 Road-User Behaviour and Traffic Accidents (1976)
 Attention and Brain Function (1992)
 Mismatch Negativity: A Probe to Auditory Perception and Cognition in Basic and Clinical Research (chapter in the Cognitive Electrophysiology of Mind and Brain, 2003)

Most influential articles 
 The N1 wave of the human electric and magnetic response to sound - a review and an analysis of the component structure (1987, Psychophysiology, 24(4), 375-425)
 Early selective-attention effect on evoked potential reinterpreted. (1978, Acta Psychologica, 42(4), 313-29)
 The role of attention in auditory information-processing as revealed by event-related potentials and other brain measures of cognitive function (1990, Behavioral and Brain Sciences, 13(2), 201-232)
 Language-specific phoneme representations revealed by electric and magnetic brain responses (1997, Nature, 385(6615), 432-434)

Awards and recognition 
 The Honorary Senior Research Fellow, Dundee University, Scotland (1979)
 The Purkinje Prize, Praha, Czechoslovakia (1988)
 Knight, First Class, of the Order of the White Rose of Finland (1990)
 The Main Prize of the Finnish Cultural Foundation (1990)
 The Traffic-Safety Prize of the Finnish Traffic-Safety Organization (1992)
 The Distinguished Contributions Award of the Society for Psychophysiological Research (SPR), Washington D.C., USA (1995)
 George Soros Professor of Psychology, University of Tartu, Estonia (1996)
 The First National Science Award of Finland, Ministry of Education, Finland (1997)
 Honorary Doctor of Psychology, University of Jyväskylä (2000)
 Honorary Doctor of Social Sciences, University of Tartu, Estonia (2000)
 The 20th Anniversary of IOP Award for Highly Exceptional and Prize-Worthy Contributions to Psychophysiology and Related Neurosciences (International Organization of Psychophysiology, Montreal, Canada, 2002)
 Fellow of the World Innovation Foundation, U.K. (2005)
 The Honoured Fellow, The Russian Society for BioPsychiatry (RSBP) and The Russian Neuroscience Society (RNS), Russia (2005)
 The Senior Prize of the Finnish Psychological Societies and Associations, Tampere, Finland (2006)
 Honorary Doctor of Cognitive Neuroscience, University of Barcelona, Catalonia, Spain (2007)
 Nordic Prize for research within Neurodevelopmental Disorders, Sweden (2007)
 Honorary Doctor of neurosciences, University of St. Petersburg (2008)
 Honorary Doctor, Faculty of Medicine, University of Helsinki, Helsinki, Finland (2010)
 The Grand Medal of the University of Tartu, Tartu, Estonia (2010)
 Association for Psychological Science, Fellow, Washington, DC, USA (2011)
 The Main Scientific Prize of the Finnish Academy of Science and Letters, Finland (2011)
 Commander of the Order of the Lion of Finland (2012)
 The Golden Medal of the Finnish Psychological Association, Finland (2012)

References

External links
 Risto Näätänen's personal webpage

1939 births
Living people
Scientists from Helsinki
Finnish psychologists
Finnish neuroscientists
Academic staff of the University of Helsinki
Members of the Royal Swedish Academy of Sciences
Foreign Members of the Russian Academy of Sciences